The 2012 FIA WTCC Race of the United States was the ninth round of the 2012 World Touring Car Championship season and the maiden running of the FIA WTCC Race of the United States. It was held on 23 September 2012 at the Sonoma Raceway in Sonoma, California, United States.

Background
Coming into the event after the two-month break after Brazil, it was Yvan Muller was leading the championship 17 points ahead of his nearest rival and teammate Robert Huff. Norbert Michelisz was leading the Yokohama Independents' Trophy.

In the days leading up to the event, two new drivers were entered. Italian driver Felice Tedeschi was entered by Proteam Racing to drive the BMW 320 TC which had last been raced at Morocco in the hands of Isaac Tutumlu.

Robb Holland became the first American driver to compete in the WTCC when he filled in for the financially troubled Pasquale di Sabatino at bamboo-engineering.

Report

Free Practice
Alex MacDowall set the fastest time in Friday's shortened free practice session which saw Proteam debutant Tedeschi roll his car. The accident ruled him out of the rest of the event.

Chevrolet's Yvan Muller set the fastest time in Free Practice 1 with the Ford of Tom Chilton second. Wiechers-Sport driver Stefano D'Aste had an off-track excursion late in the session, covering the track with dust which resulted caught out both Darryl O'Young and MacDowall and brought out the red flag to allow the track to be cleaned. Holland made his way out onto the track in the Chevrolet Cruze for the last five minutes having awaited the arrival of a new FIA approved helmet to arrive.

Lukoil Racing Team's Gabriele Tarquini was the fastest driver in Free Practice 2 ahead of the works Chevrolet of Muller and Tiago Monteiro's SUNRED León. Having been second fastest in the morning session, Chilton was tenth behind teammate James Nash. The fastest BMW was the Zengő Motorsport car of Michelisz in twelfth.

Qualifying
Alain Menu secured pole position for Chevrolet's home race with Tarquini second ahead of Muller and Huff. Muller was fastest at the end of the interrupted Q1 session having spent much of the session trading fastest times with SEAT driver Tarquini. Tarquini's teammate, Aleksei Dudukalo brought out the red flag when he beached his car having gone off at turn one. ROAL Motorsport's Tom Coronel missed out on Q2 having spun on his final attempt, both Team AON drivers missed out on Q2 despite having been quick in practice. It had looked like Tarquini would set the fastest time in Q2 with Muller and Huff having failed to beat his time, but Menu took pole position on his final lap at the end of the session.

Warm-Up
Muller led a Chevrolet 1-2-3 in the morning warm-up session with Tarquini the fastest non-Chevrolet runner.

Race One
The action started on the first lap with Menu defending from Tarquini and forcing the Lukoil Racing driver off the track at the second corner. Further down the field moments later there was a pileup Stefano D'Aste, Darryl O'Young, Tom Chilton, Aleksei Dudukalo, Fernando Monje and Alberto Cerqui which forced the latter three into retirement. At the front, Muller and Huff were able to pass their teammate Menu who was then forced back into the pitlane after slowing with a power steering issue. Tom Coronel and Mehdi Bennani had an eventful couple of laps when the pair collided not once but twice, the second contact forcing the Moroccan into a spin and down the order. Just two laps from the end, Pepe Oriola stalled on the pit straight where his car was protected by waved yellows until the end of the race. Muller took the win ahead of Huff and Michelisz in third.

Race Two
The reversed grid race saw D'Aste start from the pole position and he led away from the start. Bennani inherited the lead half way round the first lap when D'Aste spun off leaving three BMWs leading. Muller and Huff overtook Michelisz to take third and fourth while on the following lap, Monje crashed at turn five where his car was left for the rest of the race. The order at the front didn't change until lap four when Bennani spun on his own, handing the lead to Franz Engstler. The stranded Proteam BMW brought out the safety car two laps later, by which time Muller spun Engstler out of the lead for whiche he later earned himself a drive through penalty. The race restarted on lap eight when Coronel, continuing his charge through the field from the back of the grid, took eight place from Tom Boardman. Muller served his penalty on lap nine and Huff inherited the lead, the British driver now had to defend well from the BMW of Michelisz. On the final lap, Charles Ng was black flagged for ignoring an earlier black and orange flag for loose bodywork on his car. Huff took the win with Michelisz second and Tarquini third.

Results

Qualifying

Bold denotes Pole position for second race.

Race 1

Bold denotes Fastest lap.

Race 2

Bold denotes Fastest lap.

Standings after the race

Drivers' Championship standings

Yokohama Independents' Trophy standings

Manufacturers' Championship standings

 Note: Only the top five positions are included for both sets of drivers' standings.

References 

United States
FIA WTCC Race of the United States
WTCC
WTCC